Carlos Contreras (born June 8, 1970) is a Mexican professional stock car racing driver and crew chief. He was the first Mexico-born driver racing full-time in any NASCAR national series. He has competed in the NASCAR Camping World Truck Series and NASCAR Xfinity Series.

NASCAR career

Xfinity Series

Contreras made his first Busch Series attempt in 2002 with the Hispanic Racing Team. Driving the No. 09 Chevrolet at Homestead-Miami he was unable to break into the field. He would his debut in 2003 with Jay Robinson Racing. At California Speedway, Contreras put the No. 49 Ford in the field and finished in the 26th position. He also made one start for Innovative Motorsports at Homestead-Miami. He drove the No. 48 Chevrolet to a 17th-place finish. In 2005 he would return to the Busch Series with Fitz Motorsports. He drove the No. 40 Dodge in five races and the No. 12 Dodge in one race. His best finish would come at Homestead-Miami, where he would finish 25th. For the 2006 season, Contreras has again returned to Fitz Motorsports where he has competed in races with the No. 12 team and the No. 14 team. He best finish on the season is an 11th at Autodromo Hermanos Rodriguez.

In 2014, Contreras returned to the Nationwide Series, competing in a limited number of races for Rick Ware Racing.

Camping World Truck Series
He debuted at the 1999 NAPA Auto Parts 200 at California Speedway with the No. 68 Dodge. Contreras would drive the car to a 14th-place finish in his first race. In 2000, he competed in the full season for Impact Motorsports in No. 12 Dodge. He has two top tens during the season and finished 17th in points. He moved to Petty Enterprises in 2001. He would again post two top tens on the season and move up to 14th in the overall points standings. For the 2002 season, Contreras returned with to the series with Petty Enterprises and again turned in another solid season. He would post one top ten on the season and would rank 16th in the overall point standings. He made his return to the Truck Series in 2010 after it was renamed the Camping World Truck Series, driving the No. 00 Chevy for the 2010 NextEra Energy Resources 250 for the first time since 2002, finishing 14th.

Motorsports career results

NASCAR
(key) (Bold – Pole position awarded by qualifying time. Italics – Pole position earned by points standings or practice time. * – Most laps led.)

Xfinity Series

Camping World Truck Series

West Series

 Season still in progress
 Ineligible for series points

References

External links
 

Living people
1970 births
Racing drivers from Mexico City
Mexican racing drivers
NASCAR drivers